Republic of North Macedonia competed at the 2015 European Games, in Baku, Azerbaijan from 12 to 28 June 2015.

Medalists

Athletics

Macedonia has qualified 50 athletes.

 Mixed team – 1 team of 50 athletes

Gymnastics

Macedonia has qualified 1 athlete.

Artistic
 Men's – 1 quota place,

Karate

Macedonia has qualified 2 athletes.

 Men's −60kg – 1 quota place
 Men's +84kg – 1 quota place

Sambo

Macedonia has qualified 1 athlete.

 Men's +100kg – 1 quota place

References

Nations at the 2015 European Games
European Games
North Macedonia at the European Games